Prema Ishq Kaadhal is a 2013 Telugu romantic-comedy anthology film directed by Pavan Sadineni. The film was produced by Bekkam Venugopal of Lucky Media. The cinematography was handled by Karthik Gattamneni, who is famous for cinematography and direction of short films from the studio Pondfreaks Entertainment. Harshvardhan Rane, Sree Vishnu and Harish, with Vithika Sheru, Ritu Varma and Sreemukhi play three romantic couples.

Plot

Prema Idhq Kaadal tells three love failure stories simultaneously.

Story 1:

Ranadhir "Randy" (Harshvardhan Rane) is a musician who runs a band in his cafe. One day after his performance, Sarayu (Vithika Sheru) meets him to applaud his talent. Eventually their encounter turns into love. Sarayu encourages Randy to perform on the stage. Even though music is only a hobby for him, Randy performs for Sarayu on the stage. The concert becomes a huge success and he becomes famous. He starts performing as a full time musician. Due to his busy schedule, there is no time for personal life which leads to distance in his relationship with Sarayu. Sarayu loses trust in Randy's love as he avoids her. She pressures him to leave the music industry. He hesitantly agrees on the condition that he gives one last performance. But Sarayu doesn't accept the condition and gives Randy an ultimatum to choose between her and music. Before Randy's concert, he goes to Sarayu's residence and pleads to allow his last performance but she doesn't agree. Suddenly Sarayu's brother (Ravi Prakash) catches them and creates havoc. Sarayu lies to her brother that Randy is a wayward Romeo. Heart-broken, Randy leaves her coming to terms with her selfishness. He realizes that music is his love and life and decides to move on from her.

Story 2:

Royal Raju (Sree Vishnu) is a carefree, good-for-nothing boy from West Godavari district who comes to Hyderabad to woo a city girl. He wants to show off to his cousin that he can get a more beautiful girlfriend than his cousin's. He stays with his childhood buddy. One night a car crashes into a pole in front of Raju. Raju saves the driver who is a drunk woman and admits her to a hospital. She is Sameera (Ritu Varma), an ultra modern girl working as a Stylist in the film industry. They both become friends. Though Raju tries to get Sameera's attention, Sameera ignores him. He manages to join as Assistant Director in Millenium Star Mahanama (Satyam Rajesh)'s film to get close to her as she is the stylist for the movie. Several comical circumstances ensue and Mahanama asks Raju to get Sameera through casting couch. Enraged, Raju slaps him but Sameera who doesn't know the context, misunderstands him and avoids him. Raju tries to apologise to her which results in her matrimonial matchmaking becoming a disaster. Eventually, Sameera realizes that he is innocent and apologizes for misunderstanding him. Later at a film function, both get drunk and make love. The next day, Raju expresses his feelings for her and proposes to her. But Sameera rejects the proposal and says that it was just an accident. She mentions that she doesn't have any feelings for him. Even though he is a dumb country brute, she was only having fun with him. Heartbroken, Raju shares his pain with his friend and decides to aim big and find a purpose in life.

Story 3:

Arjun (Harish Varma), an RJ in Radio Mirchi, is a playboy. One day he meets an orthodox girl Shanti (Sreemukhi) from Chennai who is an IT professional through his friend Snigda 'Sid' (Snigdha). He tries to flirt with her but aware of his nature, she ignores him. Eventually, she agrees but only on certain conditions. Arjun proposes to her, which she neither accepts nor rejects. After a few circumstances because of Arjun, Shanti's promotion is put on hold by her boss. She starts avoiding him claiming that she is becoming close to her boss. Later in a pub parking lot, Arjun notices Shanti getting intimate with her boss in his car. He realizes that he loves her so much but also questions her true nature. Shanti blames him for her nature and mentions that she was inspired by him to flirt with her boss (who is also interested in her) to get a promotion. She says that if they both married, this would be the prime reason to get a divorce. She says goodbye to him and decides to go back to Chennai. Later Sid questions Arjun and Shanti's morals. Arjun replies that he thought the girl who cheated on him doesn't have character but after meeting Shanti, he realises that he doesn't have character either. Finally Arjun, now a changed man, decides to apologize to every girl with whom he had a relationship.

Cast
 Harshvardhan Rane as Randhir "Randy"
 Sree Vishnu as Royal Raju
 Harish Varma as Arjun
 Vithika Sheru as Sarayu
 Ritu Varma as Sameera
 Sreemukhi as Shanti
 Satyam Rajesh as Millennium Star Maha nama 
 Satya as Millennium Star's assistant
 Edward Stevenson Pereji
 Snigdha as Snigdha "Sid"
 Josh Ravi as Dolly
 Ravi Prakash as Sarayu's brother

Production

Development
The film was in pre-production stage from January 2012 to March 2013, where director and producer were keen in developing the narrative of the motion picture. During the pre-production time, the director Pavan Sadineni has also directed a short film Bewars, in which Karthik Gattamneni was the cinematographer, and Vishnu Vardhan played the protagonist. Vardhan was cast to play in Prema Ishq Kaadhal, and Harshvardhan was roped in to play a rock star in the film. Vithika Sheru, who is paired opposite him also donned the hat of a stylist for the film, while Rane worked as the choreographer for the climax song.

Filming
The principal photography for the movie began on 9 April 2013, and the major scenes were shot in a special coffee shop set that was erected specially for this movie at Nanakramguda. The filming of the movie was expected to end in May 2013.

The producer planned to select 100 city students and record their responses to the film and carry out the changes they suggest. The film was shot in 50 days.

Soundtrack

The soundtrack with six songs were released on 24 October 2013.

References

External links
 https://web.archive.org/web/20131208112028/http://filmcircle.com/prema-ishq-kaadhal-review/

2013 films
Indian romantic comedy films
2013 romantic comedy films
2013 directorial debut films